"Rope" is a 1959 Australian TV play based on the play by Patrick Hamilton. It was part of Shell Presents.

The play Rope had been filmed for Australian television by the ABC in 1957.

Plot
Two friends, Charles and Wyndham, murder someone for fun.

Cast
John Glennon as Wyndham Brandon
Paul Karo as Charles Granillo
Walter Sullivan as Rupert
Feli Wittman as Simone
Tom Farley
Graeme Jones
Muriel Hearne

Production

The play was adapted by American actor-playwright John Glennon who also played one of the lead roles. Sydney model Feil Wittman made her acting debut as Simone.

Glennon made several changes to the play including cutting the time down from two hours to an hour, shifting the action from 1929 to present day New York, and moving the local from one room to a four-room penthouse. "Whereas the original dealt with distance," said Glennon, "you can now eliminate long speeches and convey the same idea by gesture or by a bit of business magnified a hundred fold  by that eagle eyed camera."

Reception
The Sydney Morning Herald critic praised "John Glennon' s clever, perceptive and highly mannered performance... and the tensions which producer Rod Kinnear was able to generate by some thoughtful camera work, and some very skilful organisation on a large and attractive set."

The Age TV credit praised the set, credit sequence and some of the acting but had reservations about some of the performances and the direction.

References

External links
 "Rope" at National Film and Sound Archive

1950s Australian television plays
Black-and-white television episodes
1959 television plays
1959 Australian television episodes
Shell Presents